The South Florida Bulls baseball team is the intercollegiate men's baseball program representing the University of South Florida in Tampa, Florida, United States. The team competes in the American Athletic Conference of NCAA Division I. Founded in 1966, the baseball team is one of the oldest teams at the university. The Bulls have captured eleven conference titles (six regular season and five tournament) and 14 NCAA Tournament appearances. The team plays their home games on campus at USF Baseball Stadium at Red McEwen Field and are coached by Billy Mohl.

History

Beefy Wright era 
The baseball team was founded in spring 1966 as one of the original varsity sports teams at USF. Beefy Wright was the first coach of the team. They played most home games during their first season at Al Lopez Field in West Tampa, around 12 miles from campus, but some games were played at Cuscaden Field in Tampa's Ybor City neighborhood. The Bulls first played as independents in the NCAA College Division, now known as Division II. For their second season the team started playing at a new on-campus stadium originally known as USF Baseball Field, and later called Red McEwen Field.

Though the team had winning records in five of their first eight seasons, they were never selected for the NCAA tournament. In 1973, the final season in the College Division, second baseman Mike Campbell was named the first All-American in program history. They moved to NCAA Division I beginning in 1974. On March 8, 1974, just the sixth game for the team since joining Division I, Steve Ruling threw the first no-hitter in USF baseball history to complete a sweep against UConn. Beefy Wright left the school after the 1974 season, and was replaced by Jack Butterfield.

Jack Butterfield era 
Despite only coaching the team for two seasons, Jack Butterfield led the Bulls to their two best records ever up to that point. To this day, Butterfield has the best winning percentage of any USF baseball coach (.715). He left after the 1976 season to become a scout for the New York Yankees.

Robin Roberts era 
Robin Roberts took over the team in 1977. Roberts had been inducted into the National Baseball Hall of Fame the year prior for his 18-year MLB career, most notably with the Philadelphia Phillies. In 1978, the school's first season in the Sun Belt Conference, he was named the Sun Belt coach of the year. He would be given this honor again in 1980, 1981, and 1982. In 1982, Roberts' Bulls won the regular season and tournament Sun Belt titles, the first two conference titles for the baseball team. This came after a season in which the Bulls went 45–13 (a .776 win percentage), which stands to this day as their best-ever record. They qualified for their first NCAA tournament, where they lost in the regional round to eventual national champion Miami.

Roberts would coach the Bulls until his retirement in 1985. In a ceremony before his final game, Roberts had his number 36 jersey retired by the team and honored on the outfield wall. He was the first to have his number retired by the USF baseball team.

Eddie Cardieri era 
Eddie Cardieri, an assistant under Roberts since the 1983 season, was promoted to be Roberts' replacement for 1986. He immediately found success, and the Bulls won the regular season and tournament Sun Belt titles in his first season, while Cardieri was named Sun Belt coach of the year. In the regional final of the 1986 NCAA tournament, they lost to eventual national runner-up Florida State.

The Bulls next qualified for the NCAA tournament in 1989 following a regular season Sun Belt championship. They were once again eliminated in the regional round by Florida State, who would end up in the semifinal of the College World Series. The following season, the Bulls made it to the NCAA tournament for the third time in their history after winning both the regular season and tournament Sun Belt titles again, and Cardieri was again be named the Sun Belt coach of the year. These would be their last Sun Belt titles as they moved to the Metro Conference beginning with the next season.

Against Charlotte on May 9, 1992, USF's Mark Reed threw the first and only perfect game in USF baseball history. The Bulls won the first and only title of their short stint in the Metro Conference with the 1993 regular season conference championship. Cardieri was named as the Metro Conference coach of the year for that season, and the Bulls were given an at-large bid for the NCAA tournament.

The Metro Conference merged with the Great Midwest Conference to form Conference USA beginning in the 1995 season. USF won the regular season and tournament titles for the inaugural year of the new conference, and appeared in the first of three straight NCAA tournaments. They appeared in the NCAA tournament again in 2001 and 2002 before moving from Conference USA to the Big East Conference in 2005.

Eddie Cardieri resigned after a 23–35 season in 2006, his 21st year with the Bulls. He stands today as by far the winningest coach in USF baseball history with 731 victories (Robin Roberts, the next winningest coach in team history, only had 262 wins).

Lelo Prado era 
Louisville head coach Lelo Prado, who grew up in Tampa, was hired by USF to fill Cardieri's shoes for the 2007 season. He formerly played and coached for the Division II University of Tampa and led them to two national titles as coach. Despite the Bulls posting winning records in five of Prado's eight seasons (including 2009 when Prado was Big East coach of the year), they never won a conference title or appeared in an NCAA tournament. Prado stepped down to an advisory role following the 2014 season, and in 2018 became an assistant athletic director at USF.

Mark Kingston era 
Illinois State head coach Mark Kingston was hired as Prado's replacement. In 2015, his first season, he brought the Bulls back to the NCAA tournament for the first time since 2002. In 2017, he did it again on top of the team earning their best record in over 20 years. He left to become the head coach at South Carolina after the 2017 season.

Billy Mohl era 
USF pitching coach Billy Mohl was promoted to the head coaching job beginning in 2018. He brought the Bulls to the NCAA tournament in his first season. In 2021, his Bulls were predicted to finish last of the eight teams in the American Athletic Conference in the annual media day poll, and ended the regular season in sixth. However, the team got hot at the perfect time, and reached the championship game of the AAC Tournament where they defeated rival Central Florida for their first conference title in 25 years. They stayed hot in the NCAA tournament and defeated powerhouses Florida and Miami in the Gainesville Regional to qualify for their first-ever Super Regional, where they lost to No. 2 Texas.

USF Baseball Stadium

Opened in 2012 on the same site as the former stadium, Red McEwen Field, the USF Baseball Stadium is a 1,500-seat facility with the potential to hold a capacity crowd of 3,211.

Season by season results

Individuals

Players

Perfect Games 
There has been one perfect game thrown in USF history:

 Mark Reed, May 9, 1992, vs Charlotte

No Hitters 
Bulls pitchers have thrown three no hitters in school history (not including Reed's perfect game):

 Steve Ruling, March 8, 1974, vs UConn
 Randy Fontanez, March 26, 2010 vs Notre Dame
 Shane McClanahan and Carson Ragsdale, March 16, 2017, vs Army

Major Leaguers
South Florida has produced 127 players drafted into Major League Baseball including four first round selections. 19 of these players have gone on to play in the MLB, including two active players.

David Villar - 3B (2022–Present)
 Shane McClanahan – LHP (2020–Present)
  Phoenix Sanders  - RHP ( 2022-Present )
 Austin Adams – RHP (2017–Present)
 Dan Otero – RHP (2012–2019)
 Kevin Quackenbush – RHP (2014–2018)
 Ross Gload – 1B/OF (2000–2011)
 Jeff Baisley – 1B/3B (2008)
 Chris Heintz – C (2005–2007), current Gulf Coast League Phillies hitting coach
 Dave Eiland – RHP (1988–2000), current Kansas City Royals pitching coach
 Jason Dellaero – SS (1999)
 Tony Fossas – LHP (1988–1999), current Daytona Tortugas pitching coach
 Fred Rath Jr. – RHP (1998)
 Scott Hemond – INF (1989–1995)
 Tim Hulett – INF (1983–1995), current head baseball coach at Evangel Christian Academy in Shreveport, Louisiana
 Derek Lee – OF (1993)
 Chris Welsh – LHP (1981–1986), current Cincinnati Reds color commentator
 Ben Hayes – RHP (1982–1983), current league president of the New York–Penn League
 Eric Soderholm – 3B (1971–1980)
 Tony La Russa – INF (1963–1973), Hall of Fame manager for the Chicago White Sox, Oakland Athletics, and St. Louis Cardinals, three time World Series champion
 Jack Jenkins – RHP (1962–1969)

All-Americans
Seven members of South Florida baseball teams have been selected as First Team All-Americans.

 Mike Campbell – 1973, 2B (Div. II)
 Lou Garcia – 1975, 2B
 Scott Hemond – 1984, 1986, C
 Darren Stumberger – 1993, 1B
 Doug Carroll – 1994, OF
 Chris Heintz – 1996, 3B

Conference Player of the Year 
Four Bulls have been named the conference player of the year.

 Mike Kelly – 1987
 Troy Rusk – 1989
 Chris Heintz – 1996
 Ross Gload – 1997

Coaches

Conference Coach of the Year 
USF head coaches have won 10 conference coach of the year awards.

 Robin Roberts – 1978
 Robin Roberts – 1980
 Robin Roberts – 1981
 Robin Roberts – 1982
 Eddie Cardieri – 1986
 Eddie Cardieri – 1990
 Eddie Cardieri – 1993
 Eddie Cardieri – 1995
 Eddie Cardieri – 1996
 Lelo Prado – 2009

USF Athletic Hall of Fame members 

Two USF baseball players have been inducted into the USF Athletic Hall of Fame:

 Ross Gload (inducted 2010)
 Chris Heintz (inducted 2013)

Retired numbers 

 7 – Ross Gload (1B/OF 1995–97)
 11 – Scott Hemond (C, 1984–86)
 23 – Chris Heintz (3B, 1993–96)
 36 – Robin Roberts (Head Coach, 1978–85)

Media
Under the current American Athletic Conference TV deal, all home and in-conference away baseball games are shown on one of the various ESPN networks or streamed live on ESPN+. Live radio broadcasts of baseball games are also available nationwide for free on the Bulls Unlimited digital radio station on TuneIn.

See also

 List of NCAA Division I baseball programs
 South Florida Bulls
 South Florida Bulls softball
 University of South Florida

References

External links

 Official website

 
1966 establishments in Florida
Baseball teams established in 1966